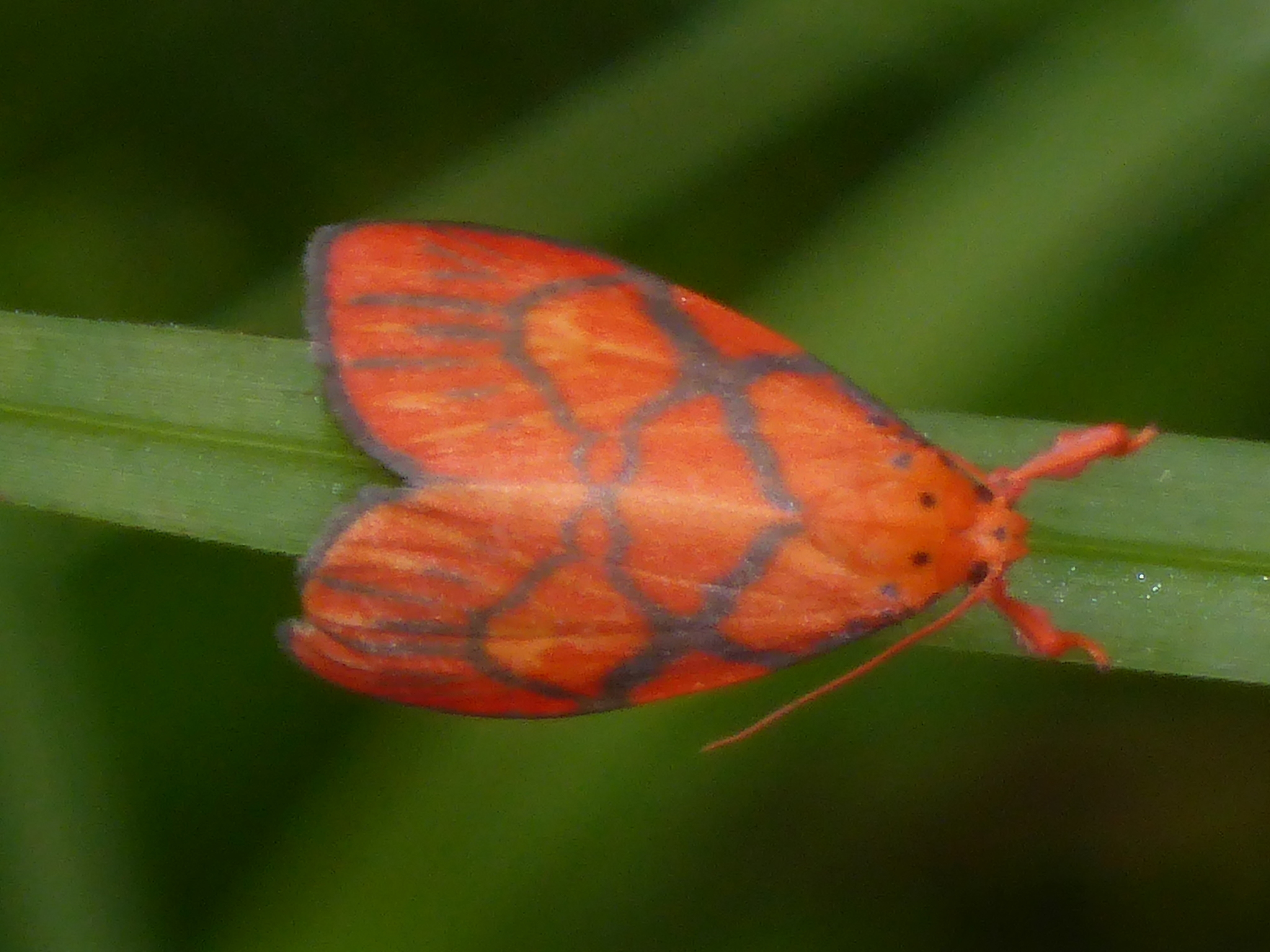
- Sarbine cruciata, Malaysia

Scientific classification
- Kingdom: Animalia
- Phylum: Arthropoda
- Class: Insecta
- Order: Lepidoptera
- Superfamily: Noctuoidea
- Family: Erebidae
- Subfamily: Arctiinae
- Tribe: Lithosiini
- Genus: Processine (moth); Volynkin, 2019

= Processine (moth) =

Genus of moths

Processine is a genus in the moth family Erebidae. There are at least two described species in Processine, found in Southern China and northern Indochina.

== Species ==
These two species belong to the genus Processine:

- Processine cruciata (Walker, 1862)
- Processine siberuta (Volynkin & Černý, 2019)
